La Revuelta is the tenth album by the Argentine rock band Bersuit Vergarabat. This is the first album recorded by Bersuit after a hiatus, and without the main singer and one of the founders of the band, Gustavo Cordera.

The album was produced with the collaboration of Argentinian singers Andrés Calamaro, Vicentico and Chano from Tan Biónica band.

Track listing

Personnel 
Alberto Verenzuela – guitar, vocals
Oscar Humberto Righi – guitar
Carlos E. Martín – drums
Rene Isel Céspedes – bass, vocals
Daniel Suárez – vocals
Germán Sbarbatti – vocals
Juan Subirá – keyboards

References

2012 albums
Bersuit Vergarabat albums